Rusich (Русич), meaning "Rus person" in some Slavic languages, is the origin of the name Rusyn.

Rusich may refer to:

Rusich unit of PMC Wagner Group. Russian far right group
Rusich Podolsk, an ice hockey team in Podolsk, Russia
Metro wagon 81-740/741 Rusich, a type of rolling stock used in several Russian metro systems
Stellina Rusich, Canadian actress  in the television series Monk

See also
Rusic
Rosich, a surname
Rosic (disambiguation)
Russian Imperial Movement
Sparta Battalion